Isidor Lewi (May 9, 1850 – 1938 or 1939) was a journalist who served on the editorial board of the New York Tribune. 
He once interviewed Charles Dickens.

Lewi was educated in the Albany Academy. His wife was Emita May (d. on January 23, 1931), they were noted in their community for charitable work.

Lewi shook hands with Abraham Lincoln. 

Lewi also edited and published The New Era Illustrated Magazine.

References

1850 births
1930s deaths
Year of death uncertain
People from Albany, New York
American male journalists